Videodrom is the third studio album by the German metalcore band Callejon. It entered the German Media Control Charts at number 31.

Track listing

Charts

References

External links 
 
 Videodrom at Callejon's official website

2010 albums
Callejon (band) albums